This is the timeline of the 3 longest supported deck arch bridge spans in the world, where the road deck lies on top of the arch. The deck is supported by columns, truss, rubble or lies directly on the arch. These bridges are often found in narrow valleys.

Because of the difficulty in telling an arch bridge apart from a bent beam bridge or certain cantilever bridges, all bridges that look like supported deck arch bridges are included in this timeline. The whole arch should be aesthetically visible uninterrupted by other structures such as the deck. Suspended deck arch bridges are excluded. The lower deck of the Eads Bridge is suspended a bit, but not below the underside of the arch, and the upper deck is completely above of the arch, so Eads is included. The lower deck of Dom Luís Bridge, Porto is suspended as far as is possible, making it also a suspended bridge, so it is excluded.

There are some truss bridges like Permanent Bridge where the deck passes through the arch. Since the deck does not lie on top of the load-bearing arch, but is suspended a bit measured from the top of the arch, those types are excluded. Eads Bridge was not excluded because the existence of such a lower deck does not change the appearance of the bridge much with respect of the arch.

In this timeline, only spans that were still standing a particular year are considered for that year. This is perhaps more fair than a timeline of the records of all time, because the old figures might be incorrect. At the points when the old spans falls, new spans with more certain figures are allowed to appear in the timeline. This is the historic top 3 lists of standing longest spans per day.

When several bridges of the same length exists, the oldest is counted as the longest.

Note: Some information in this timeline have uncertainty, especially before 1874.

Longest Spans 1796 - present

Longest Spans 142 BC - 1796

Known incorrect construction years 

In this table the finishing years of construction of the structures shown in the timeline, that are known to be incorrect, are listed. If a guess was not made for the years of construction that are unknown, the graphical timeline could not be drawn. Some timber arches are probably missing from the timeline in the 19th century.

External links 
:cs:Žďákovský most Žďákov bridge has a span of 362 m. The steel part of the span is 330 m. http://www.karl-gotsch.de/Brdaten/Beschreibung_273.htm, http://www.libri.cz/databaze/mosty/obrazek.php?src=./pics/3451/431u-Zdakov_a.jpg&title=%AE%CF%C1KOV. Both following sources have incorrect values of the span: http://en.structurae.de/structures/data/index.cfm?id=s0005872, http://www.brueckenweb.de/2content/datenbank/bruecken/3brueckenblatt.php?bas=174
:pt:Ponte do Porto, http://en.structurae.de/structures/data/index.cfm?id=s0020363
Cascade bridge https://web.archive.org/web/20131216060339/http://www.catskillarchive.com/rrextra/ERIECASC.Html
:fr:Viaduc du Viaur http://en.structurae.de/structures/data/index.cfm?ID=s0000163
Permanent Bridge http://www.catskillarchive.com/rrextra/brcoo0.Html http://en.structurae.de/structures/data/index.cfm?id=s0002231
Bamberg bridge  Hypothesis:Figure of Freysingen, similar to Bamberg 

Deck arch bridges
Lists of construction records
Spans, three longest supported deck arch bridge